The Szakoly Power Plant is one of Hungary's largest biomass power plants having an installed electric capacity of 20 MW.

References

Energy infrastructure completed in 2008
Biomass power stations in Hungary